Heidi Andenmatten-Zurbriggen (born 16 March 1967) in Saas-Almagell, Kanton Wallis) is a Swiss former alpine skier. She is the sister of Pirmin Zurbriggen, an aunt of Elia Zurbriggen and cousin of Silvan Zurbriggen. She won 3 Downhill races on the World Cup tour. She competed at the 1992, 1994 and the 1998 Winter Olympics.

She now operates Chalet Rustica with her husband Damian Andenmatten in Saas-Almagell.

World Cup Victories

Downhill

References

1967 births
Living people
Swiss female alpine skiers
Olympic alpine skiers of Switzerland
Alpine skiers at the 1992 Winter Olympics
Alpine skiers at the 1994 Winter Olympics
Alpine skiers at the 1998 Winter Olympics
20th-century Swiss women